James Joseph Suchecki (August 25, 1927 – July 20, 2000) was a pitcher in Major League Baseball who played from 1950 through 1952 for the Boston Red Sox (1950), St. Louis Browns (1951) and Pittsburgh Pirates (1952). Listed at 5' 11", 185 lb., Suchecki batted and threw right-handed. He was born in Chicago.

In a three-season career, Suchecki posted a 0–6 record with a 5.38 ERA in 38 appearances, including six starts, 17 games finished, 56 strikeouts, 50 walks, 130 hits allowed, and 103.2 innings of work.

Suchecki died in Crofton, Maryland at age 72.

External links 

Retrosheet

1927 births
2000 deaths
Boston Red Sox players
Pittsburgh Pirates players
St. Louis Browns players
Major League Baseball pitchers
Baseball players from Illinois
Roanoke Red Sox players
Scranton Miners players
Lynn Red Sox players
Birmingham Barons players
Louisville Colonels (minor league) players
Memphis Chickasaws players
Dallas Eagles players
Seattle Rainiers players
Nashville Vols players
People from Crofton, Maryland